Adrian Spies (April 17, 1920 – October 2, 1998) was an American screenwriter, active from the 1940s through to the 1980s.

He won an Edgar Award for an episode of Studio One in Hollywood and was nominated for an Emmy Award for an episode of Dr. Kildare.

Filmography

Films

Television

External links

1920 births
1998 deaths
American television writers
American male television writers
20th-century American screenwriters
20th-century American male writers